Mikhail Petrovich Minin (July 29, 1922 – January 10, 2008) was a Russian Soviet soldier who was the first to enter the Reichstag building on April 30, 1945, during the Battle of Berlin, and the first soldier to mount the flag on the Reichstag building at 10:40 pm. He was born in Palkinsky District.

The iconic picture showing a Georgian soldier, Meliton Kantaria, fixing a pole with the hammer-and-sickle flag blowing in the wind was posed on the Reichstag roof two days later, on May 2, 1945. The night that the Reichstag was taken by Minin's platoon there was no photographer available.

Mikhail Minin was born in 1922 in the village of Vanino, in western Russia's Pskov Oblast. In June 1941 he volunteered to join the army to fight against Nazi Germany. He took part in battles to liberate Leningrad from blockade and made his way across the fronts from Leningrad to Berlin.

The Battle of Berlin
Joseph Stalin had urged his troops to mount the flag on the Reichstag building no later than May 1, 1945. Minin's superiors had told the soldiers that any piece of red cloth fixed to the building would symbolize that the battle was won.

Minin recalled in a recent interview in a German documentary, the "War of the Century", that by the time the building needed to be stormed, morale among the victorious Soviet soldiers was low. They knew the building could only be taken on foot and it was still heavily defended. So his commanders decided to launch a night attack and Minin was put in charge of the platoon.

"Nobody really wanted to die that night because the war was already won," he declared. "Even a promise by our officers that those who captured the building would get the highest decoration of Hero of the Soviet Union called forth few volunteers. Except for my little company." The four men, G. Zagitov, A. Lisimenko, A. Bobrov, and M. Minin, made their way towards the Reichstag they were met by heavy fire.

Minin later reported

Minin was recognized for his feat, but was not rewarded as one would expect: even though the brigade's commanders requested that all soldiers in Minin's platoon be awarded the Hero of Soviet Union decoration, they only received a lower-ranking decoration, the Order of the Red Banner. As there were no photos taken when the flag was put on the roof on 10 p.m., other photos were taken afterwards to recreate the event for the camera.

The details were documented in part 19/19 of a German documentary from 2004 called The War of the Century. The documentary includes Minin revisiting the Reichstag and meeting a German soldier who was hiding inside.

Recognition
Following the end of World War II, Minin continued his army service. In 1959 he graduated from the V. V. Kuibyshev Military Engineering Academy in Moscow and joined Strategic Rocket Forces. He retired from the military in 1969 as a lieutenant colonel.

He moved to Pskov in 1977 and decided to stay in the city afterwards. Minin had to wait five decades for a greater recognition, finally granted to him with an official honour by President Boris Yeltsin, on the 50th anniversary of the end of the Second World War. Minin died on January 10, 2008, and was buried in his native city of Pskov on January 12, 2008.

References

1922 births
2008 deaths
People from Pskov Oblast
1945 in Germany
Russian people of World War II
Soviet military personnel of World War II
Battle of Berlin
Recipients of the Order of the Red Banner
People nominated for the title Hero of the Soviet Union